Kalawy Bay is a resort on the Red Sea in the Red Sea Governorate of southeastern Egypt. The Eastern Desert region of the Sahara begins behind the resort on the west.

Resort
Kalawy Bay is a newly built and tourist dominated holiday village located in a small bay of the same name on the Red Sea.  The settlement consists of a hotel complex, located 32 kilometers south of Safaga. A short distance in front of the beach are some of the smaller reefs of the sea.

See also

Eastern Desert

Populated places in Red Sea Governorate
Red Sea